A Self-Made Failure is a 1924 American silent comedy film distributed by Associated First National Pictures, later First National Pictures. It was directed by William Beaudine and starred silent comic Lloyd Hamilton and then child actor Ben Alexander. At the time it was released, it one of the longest comedy features ever made.

Cast

Preservation
No copies of A Self-Made Failure are in any film archives, making it a lost film. While the film is lost, a trailer of it survives in the Library of Congress film collection.

References

External links

Lobby poster and still at silenthollywood.com

1924 films
American silent feature films
Films directed by William Beaudine
Lost American films
First National Pictures films
1924 comedy films
Silent American comedy films
American black-and-white films
Films with screenplays by John Grey
1924 lost films
Lost comedy films
1920s American films